The governor of Maine is the head of government of the U.S. state of Maine. Before Maine was admitted to the Union in 1820, Maine was part of Massachusetts and the governor of Massachusetts was chief executive.

The current governor of Maine is Janet Mills, a Democrat, who took office January 2, 2019. 

The governor of Maine receives a salary of $70,000, which is the lowest salary out of all 50 state governors, as of 2022.

Eligibility
Under Article V, Section 4, a person must as of the commencement of the term in office, be 30 years old, for 15 years a citizen of the United States, and for five years a resident of Maine. A governor must retain residency in Maine throughout his or her term. Section 5 provides that a person shall not assume the office of Governor while holding any other office under the United States, Maine, or "any other power".

Elections and terms of office

Governors are elected directly for four-years terms, with a limit of two consecutive elected terms. Thus, a governor can serve an unlimited number of terms, as long as they serve no more than two in a row (Article V, Section 2). Elections are by popular vote, but if two people tie for first place, the Legislature meets in joint session to choose between them (Article V, Section 3).

Executive powers
The governor is commander-in-chief of "the army and navy of the State, and of the militia" (the Maine National Guard), except when under federal control (Article V, Section 7). The governor generally has the power to appoint civil, military, and judicial officers (aside from probate judges and justices of the peace), subject to confirmation by the Legislature, unless the Maine Constitution or a statute has provided another means of appointment (Article V, Section 8). The governor also has the power to grant pardons, reprieves, and commutations, except in cases of impeachment. This clemency power also includes juvenile offenses (Article V, Section 11).

Cabinet
The Governor oversees the executive branch, which includes Maine's state agencies. Their cabinet is often considered to be the state's commissioners, which are generally nominated by the governor but legally chosen by the Maine Legislature.

Current Cabinet
As of January 2019, the cabinet is as follows:

Succession
Maine is one of five states that does not have an office of lieutenant governor. Under current law, if there is a vacancy in the office of governor, the president of the Maine Senate becomes governor. , the Senate president is Democrat Troy Jackson.

Official residence
The Blaine House in Augusta is the official governor's mansion, and is located across the street from the Maine State House. It became the official residence in 1919, and is named for James G. Blaine, who once owned the mansion. The house was built by Captain James Hall in 1833 and declared a National Historic Landmark in 1964.

List of governors

References

1820 establishments in Maine